European Parliament elections were held in Greece on 13 June 2004 to elect 24 Greek members of the European Parliament. Members were elected by party-list proportional representation with a 3% electoral threshold.

Results
The 2004 European election was the sixth election to the European Parliament. The ruling New Democracy party made strong gains, while the opposition PASOK made smaller gains, both at the expense of minor parties. The traditionalist Popular Orthodox Rally, contested in the election for the first time and elected one MEP.

References

Greece
European Parliament elections in Greece
2004 in Greek politics
Europe